Chin Rural District is a rural district (dehestan) in Ludab District, Boyer-Ahmad County, Kohgiluyeh and Boyer-Ahmad Province, Iran. At the 2006 census, its population was 4,879, in 948 families. The rural district has 54 villages.

References 

Rural Districts of Kohgiluyeh and Boyer-Ahmad Province
Boyer-Ahmad County
Populated places in Boyer-Ahmad County